James N. Butcher is an American psychologist. He was a member of the Department of Psychology at the University of Minnesota. He received the Bruno Klopfer Award in 2004.

He was involved in the creation of the 2nd revision of the Minnesota Multiphasic Personality Inventory.

He graduated from Guilford College (B.A. psychology, 1960) then the University of North Carolina at Chapel Hill (M.A. experimental psychology, 1962; Ph.D. clinical psychology, 1964).

References 

Year of birth missing (living people)
Living people
21st-century American psychologists
University of North Carolina at Chapel Hill alumni